Szigetszentmiklós is a city in Pest County, Hungary, with around 40,000 inhabitants.

Name
 Sziget – island: Szigetszentmiklós is a town on Csepel Island
 Szent Miklós – Saint Nicholas, who is the patron saint of Szigetszentmiklós

Location
Szigetszentmiklós is located south of Budapest in the Csepel Island on the Danube in Ráckeve Region.

History
After the Árpád dynasty was established, the region of today's Ráckeve belonged to the Hungarian king. Szigetszentmiklós became a town in January 1986.

It mentioned in official document in 1264 the first time.

Demographics

Ethnicity
 Hungarian: 91.3%
 German: 0.6%
 Slovak: 0.6%
 Romani: 0.5%
 Bulgarians: 0.2%
 Ukrainian: 0.1%
 Other/Undeclared: 8.5%

Religious denomination
 Roman Catholic: 35.9%
 Greek Catholic: 2.2%
 Calvinist: 21.4%
 Lutheran: 1.0%
 Other denomination: 2.1%
 Non-religious: 20.7%
 Undeclared: 16.6%

Twin towns – sister cities

Szigetszentmiklós is twinned with:

 Busko-Zdrój, Poland (2003)
 Gheorgheni, Romania (1996)
 Gorna Oryahovitsa, Bulgaria (2004)
 Kočani, North Macedonia (2004)
 Oulu, Finland (1992)
 Specchia, Italy (2003)
 Steinheim, Germany (2003)
 Sveti Martin na Muri, Croatia

Gallery

References

External links
 Central Region
 Map of Szigetszentmiklós
 Szigetszentmiklós Baptist Church
 Lakihegyi Lakópark

 
Populated places in Pest County